Knightwick is a small village and civil parish (with Doddenham) in the Malvern Hills district in  the county of Worcestershire, England.

History

Following the Poor Law Amendment Act 1834 Knightwick Parish ceased to be responsible for maintaining the poor in its parish. This responsibility was transferred to Martley Poor Law Union.

Previously served by the now closed Worcester, Bromyard and Leominster Railway.

References

External links

 Knightwick web site
 

Villages in Worcestershire
Civil parishes in Worcestershire